Miyandasht District is in Darmian County, South Khorasan province, Iran. Prior to its formation after the 2016 National Census, its constituent parts were in the Central District and Qohestan District. The capital of the new district is the village of Bureng, whose population at the 2016 census was 2,276 people in 687 households.

References 

Darmian County

Districts of South Khorasan Province

Populated places in South Khorasan Province

Populated places in Darmian County

fa:بخش میاندشت